Secret Wars is a 1984–1985 comics series.

Secret Wars or Secret War may also refer to:

History
Laotian Civil War (1959–1975), or Secret War, referring to American clandestine involvement as part of the Vietnam War

Arts and entertainment

Comics
Secret Wars II, a 1985–1986 Marvel Comics series
"Secret Wars III", a 1988 Marvel Comics storyline
Secret War (comics), a 2004–2005 Marvel Comics series
Secret Wars (2015 comic book), a 2015–2016 Marvel Comics series

Film and television
Secret Wars (2014 film), a 2014 Polish film
"Secret Wars" (Spider-Man), a 1997 three-episode storyline of Spider-Man: The Animated Series
The Secret War (TV series), a 1977 World War II documentary series
"Secret Wars", the subtitle of the fourth season of Avengers: Assemble
Avengers: Secret Wars, an upcoming 2026 film

Other media
Secret Wars (adventure), a role-playing game adventure based on the 1984 comics series
Secret Wars (toy line), an action figure tie-in to the 1984 comics series
Secret Wars (album), a 2004 album by Oneida
The Secret War, a pre-launch campaign for the MMORPG The Secret World

See also
Secret Warriors (disambiguation)
Secrets of War, a 2007 book by Jacques Vriens
Sworn to Secrecy or Secrets of War, an American history documentary TV series